James William Travers Grimshaw (17 February 1912 – 26 September 1944) was an English cricketer who played first-class cricket between 1932 and 1936. Grimshaw was born in Darlington, County Durham in 1912 and attended King William's College on the Isle of Man before going up to Cambridge University. He gained a cricket Blue and played for the university cricket team, making his debut in the 1932 season.

Grimshaw played 29 first-class cricket matches in his career, playing mainly for his University in the 1934 and 1935 seasons. He played two matches for Kent County Cricket Club in 1934 and appeared for MCC in 1936. He was a slow left-arm orthodox bowler who took 65 wickets in his career.

Grimshaw served in the Royal Artillery as a Warrant Officer during World War II. He was a member of 86 Heavy Anti-Aircraft Regiment of the Honourable Artillery Company before transferring to 275 Battery, 165 Heavy Anti-Aircraft Regiment. He rose to the rank of Battery Sergeant Major. He was killed in action on 29 September 1944 at Nijmegen in the Netherlands at the end of Operation Market Garden. Grimshaw is buried at the Jonkerbos war cemetery in the town.

References

External links
 

1912 births
1944 deaths
British Army personnel killed in World War II
Cambridge University cricketers
English cricketers
Honourable Artillery Company soldiers
Kent cricketers
Marylebone Cricket Club cricketers
Royal Artillery soldiers
People educated at King William's College
Military personnel from County Durham